Virpi Talvitie (born 1961, in Ilmajoki) is a Finnish illustrator and graphic artist.

Talvitie graduated from high school in 1980 and received a bachelor of art degree in Art and Design in 1989.
 
Talvitie has illustrated magazines and children's books. In 2006, she collaborated with Timo Parvela on the book Keinulauta (Seesaw), which won the Junior Finlandia Prize, a prestigious literary prize in Finland. She won the WSOY Literature Foundation award in 2010, and the Mikkeli Illustration Triennial Prize in 2011. Talvitie has also been nominated for the Hans Christian Andersen Award for illustration in 2006, 2008 and 2012.

Illustration

Published English translations 
 2016: Bicycling to the Moon, 128pp.,

Selected Finnish titles
 Helt okej!. Kurs 1 / Siv Boström ... [et al.]; [piirrokset: Virpi Talvitie], 1998
 Ollaan ananas ja kookos : rakkausriimejä / Eppu Nuotio; kuvitus: Virpi Talvitie, 1998
 Musta Miksu, taikurikissa / Ritva Toivola; kuvittanut Virpi Talvitie, 1999
 Harmaaviirullinen Silli / Raili Mikkanen; kuvittanut Virpi Talvitie, 2000
 Elina kesyttää tiikerin / Ben Furman; kuvittanut Virpi Talvitie, 2001
 Timjami ja kadonnut kompassi / Tittamari Marttinen; kuvittanut Virpi Talvitie, 2001
 Matka joulun taloon : joulun satuja ja runoja / Hannele Huovi; kuvittanut Virpi Talvitie, 2001
 Epsukepsu / kirjoittanut Eppu Nuotio; kuvittanut Virpi Talvitie, 2002
 Joona ja yllätysten matkalaukku / Tittamari Marttinen; kuvittanut Virpi Talvitie, 2002
 Kivikauppaa ja ketunleipiä / Katri Tapola; kuvittanut Virpi Talvitie, 2002
 Lumottu lipas / Leena Laulajainen; kuvittanut Virpi Talvitie, 2002
 Äidin karkkipäivä / kirjoittanut Tittamari Marttinen; kuvittanut Virpi Talvitie, 2003
 Talot ovat yksin kotona : pohjoismaisia runoja lapsille, 2003
 Konnanmontulle hyvä kyyti /Katri Tapola; kuvittanut Virpi Talvitie, 2003
 Satu joka oli totta / kirjoittanut Katri Tapola; kuvittanut Virpi Talvitie, 2004
 Onnenpäiviä : runoja lapsen juhlaan / [koonnut] Päivi Heikkilä-Halttunen; [kirjoittajat:] Tittamari Marttinen [et al.]; kuvittanut Virpi Talvitie, 2005
 Siitä ei kukaan tiedä : kertomuksia / Maria Vuorio; kuvittanut Virpi Talvitie, 2005
 Jääpuikkoja ja jälkiä lumessa / Katri Tapola; kuvittanut Virpi Talvitie, 2005	
 Auringon lapset : adoptiolapsemme Kolumbiasta, Etiopiasta ja Thaimaasta / [teksti:] Maija Karjalainen, Pia Nynäs, Tytti Tuunanen; [piirrokset:] Virpi Talvitie, 2005

References

1961 births
People from Ilmajoki
Living people
Finnish women illustrators
Finnish children's book illustrators